Hickman Run is a  long 2nd order tributary to the Youghiogheny River in Fayette County, Pennsylvania.

Course
Hickman Run rises about 2 miles west of Owensdale, Pennsylvania, and then flows south to join the Youghiogheny River at Raineytown.

Watershed
Hickman Run drains  of area, receives about 42.1 in/year of precipitation, has a wetness index of 372.93, and is about 34% forested.

References

 
Tributaries of the Ohio River
Rivers of Pennsylvania
Rivers of Fayette County, Pennsylvania
Allegheny Plateau